League of Dutch Marxist–Leninists was a communist organisation in the Netherlands.

By the time of the 21st party congress of the Communist Party of the Netherlands in 1964 two pro-China fractions existed inside the party. One was the Marxist-Leninist Centre in Rotterdam. The other was a group based in Amsterdam which published the periodical Rode Vlag (Red Flag). The Rode Vlag-group was led by Chris Bischot, a district level leader of CPN. In December 1964 Bischot was expelled from CPN, along with the leaders of MLC.

Initially there were talks on a merger between the two dissident communist factions, but such plans could not develop further mainly because of the perception held by the Rode Vlag-group that the CPN could still be converted into a revolutionary party.

In 1966 the Rode Vlag-group started another periodical, Rode Jeugd (Red Youth). Through Rode Jeugd. Through the militant messages given in Rode Jeugd, the group expanded. It gained supporters in IJmuiden, Kampen, Eindhoven, The Hague and Rotterdam.

But Rode Jeugd would also give problems to the Rode Vlag-group. A clash of generations erupted, and in October 1967 the Rode Jeugd-group broke away and formed a separate organization called Rode Jeugd.

In 1969 the group around Rode Vlag constituted BNML. By this time they had completely left the ambition to reform the CPN. Rode Vlag became the central organ of BNML. BNML also started Rood Metal (Red Metal) as a periodical of workers.

By 1970 BVD estimated the BNML membership to around 40. The real figure was probably significantly higher.

In 1972 BNML was joined by the Red Youth (marxist-leninist), which had broken away from Rode Jeugd.

Bischot died in 1973.

In the mid-1970s BNML played an important role in conducting debates on a possible merger of the various marxist-leninist factions. Excluded from the talks were the Socialist Party (who had moved away from the Maoist orthodoxy), Red Youth (which had developed into a terroristic orientation) and the Marxist-Leninist Party of the Netherlands (which was in reality, a BVD proxy). Thus the remaining organizations were the Communist Unity Movement of the Netherlands (marxist-leninist) (KEN(ml)), the Group of Marxist-Leninists/Red Dawn (GML), the Communist Circle of Breda (marxist-leninist) (KKB(ml)) and the Communist Workers Organisation (KAO). GML excluded itself from the process due to their rejection of unity with KEN(ml), and KEN(ml) could not arrive at a comprise with the other groups due to their persistence on claiming hegemony over the other factions. In 1978 BNML merged with KAO and KKB(ml) to form the Communist Workers Organisation (marxist-leninist) (KAO(ml)).

Defunct communist parties in the Netherlands
Maoist organizations in Europe
Political parties established in 1969
1969 establishments in the Netherlands
Political parties disestablished in 1978
1978 disestablishments in the Netherlands